Li Hao was a Chinese murderer and rapist who kept six women as sex slaves and locked them in a dungeon in Henan. He murdered two of the women. Li Hao tricked the six women into entering his basement and locked them there for two to 21 months. He raped them repeatedly and forced them to appear on online pornography in 2011.

In 2012, the Luoyang court charged Li Hao with rape, murder, prostitution, illegal pornography, and illegal detention of sex slaves. Li Hao was sentenced to death. The Supreme People's Court approved the death penalty, and in 2014, Li Hao was executed for his crimes.

Of the six women that Li Hao had raped, two were surnamed Zhang (张), one was surnamed Duan (段), one was surnamed Jiang (姜), one was surnamed Cai (蔡), and one was surnamed Ma (马). The woman surnamed Cai was murdered, and Li Hao strangled one of the women surnamed Zhang to death. Li Hao forced Cai to eat feces and drink urine before her death. The victims were 16 to 23 years old at the time.

Li Hao's sister Li Yuan (李媛) was also charged for harboring a criminal and sentenced to probation.

Murder and rape case

Makeshift dungeon 
In August 2009, Li Hao bought a residential compound and dug a dungeon in his basement. He dug a tunnel in Xigong district (西工区) of Luoyang city. He spent more than a year digging the cellar. The dungeon has also been described as a 'fortified underground cellar' and 'subterranean prison'.

Li Hao's cellar was located under a residential building. It had a space of less than 20 meters. There was a tunnel connecting into the cellar with a diameter opening of 60 cm and can only be crawled through by a person. The tunnel led to two bedrooms, 4 meters underneath the cellar. Li Hao placed seven metal doors to prevent his captives from escaping. The dungeon was 215 square meters.

Li Hao's intent was to make money from online pornography and making his captives strip for 'customers'. Li Hao forcibly kept his captives starved so that they would have little energy to escape. He would only feed them once every two days. He later gave them computers so that they could watch movies and play games, but they had no Internet access. The only time they were allowed to leave was when Li needed money. Li would then force his captives to sleep with other men for cash. The women ate and defecated in the rooms, and the cellars were described as 'dank' and 'smelly'. Apparently some of the women were competing for Li Hao's attention.

From 2009 to 2011, Li Hao kidnapped six karaoke bar workers and locked them in his dungeon. According to China Central Television, Li offered to pay them for sex if they went home with him, but then proceeded to kidnap and lock them.

In October and December 2009, Li Hao first lured two women Zhang Xuanxuan (张宣宣 an alias) and Duan Moumou (段某某 female, aged 18 at the time), into his basement, detaining Zhang and Duan by violence, blackmail, and coercion.

In December 2010, Li Hao used the same method to detain Jiang Moumou (female, 19 years old) in his dungeon.

In March, May, and July 2011, Li Hao successively brought three other women Zhang Moumou (female, 20 years old), Cai Moumou (female, 16 years old at time of death), and Ma Moumou (female, 23 years old at the time). He raped the women repeatedly, causing Zhang Moumou to become pregnant.

He repeatedly abused and raped the six women, forcing them into prostitution. He filmed them and posted the pornography online for profit. He later forced three of the captives to kill two of the other women.

Intentional homicide: Murder of Zhang Xuanxuan and Cai Moumou 
In July and August 2010, Zhang Xuanxuan attacked Li from behind, taking advantage of his unprepared digging of the tunnel. Li Hao handcuffed Zhang to the bed in anger. As Zhang Xuanxuan refused to give in, Li Hao had the evil idea to kill Zhang. Li Hao then forced Duan Moumou to murder Zhang Xuanxuan in exchange for Duan's freedom. Li Hao and Duan jointly strangled Zhang to death, and Li Hao buried her in an earth pit under the bed.

Li beat Zhang to death to force the other women to 'obey'. Moreover, he buried Zhang's body close to where they slept to warn them.

Cai Moumou was another woman murdered by Li.

In May 2011, Cai Moumou was found to have gynecological disease and was unable to perform the obscene pornography Li Hao forced his captives to do. Li Hao then saw Cai Moumou as useless and had the idea of killing Cai Moumou, revealing his plan to Duan, Jiang, Ma, and Zhang Moumou. Li Hao forced the other women to beat up Cai Moumou, abusing and torturing her, starving Cai, forcing Cai to eat feces and drink urine.

One day at the end of July 2011, Li, Duan, and others beat up Cai again, and later that night she died. In order to cover up the crime, Li and Duan laid Cai's corpse in a concrete pool in a hole.

Filmed pornography 
Between March and April 2011, Li Hao forced the women to perform in pornographic shows online. Li Hao purchased a computer and video head, opening a broadband connection to his dungeon. Li Hao forced Duan, Jiang, Ma, Zhang Moumou and others to do obscene performances in his dungeon. He filmed these performances and sold them to viewers on Tencent QQ for prices of "50 yuan for 30 minutes" and "100 yuan for 50 minutes". By the time of the incident, Li Hao produced more than 50 obscene videos and collected thousands of yuan from viewing from Alipay and other forms of online banking.

Organized prostitution 
From August 2011 to September 2, 2011, Li Hao forced the women to have sex with other men in exchange for money. Li Hao arranged for Duan and Zhang Moumou, who were under Li's control, to visit a hotel in Xigong district and the welfare lottery shop across the road from the hotel. Li forced Duan and Zhang into prostitution and made more than 700 yuan in money handed by the two. On the evening of September 2, 2011, Li Hao forced Duan Moumou, Ma Moumou, and Zhang Moumou, to go to the same place for prostitution. In the early morning of the next day, Ma Moumou seized the opportunity to escape and call for the police. With the cooperation of Ma, the public security personnel rescued Jiang Moumou, who was detained in Li Hao's dungeon. Public security later rescued Duan and Zhang Moumou from the hotel and welfare loterry shop.

Li tried to escape the city and went to his sister Li Yuan to borrow money, but the police caught him. Li Hao was arrested on September 6. Li Yuan gave Li Hao 1000 yuan to help him escape, but Li Yuan was also arrested and charged by the police for helping a criminal.

Arrest and execution of Li Hao 
In 2011, local media reported Li Hao's crimes. In September 2011, a 23-year-old woman (Ma Moumou) escaped from his dungeon and reported Li Hao to the police, leading them to his basement. Li Hao was subsequently arrested. A reporter named Ji Xuguang from Guangzhou was one of the first people to expose the case to the media.

On November 30, 2012, Li Hao aged 35 was sentenced to death. The Intermediate people's court of Luoyang found Li Hao guilty with rape, murder, prostitution, illegal pornography, and illegal detention. A higher court upheld the sentence, and the Supreme People's Court approved the death penalty. Li Hao was also deprived of his political rights and fined 10,000 yuan ($1640). He was expelled from the party and public office.

On January 21, 2014, after meeting his relatives in a detention house, Li Hao was executed.

Victims and captives 
The two women who were murdered, Cai and Zhang Xuanxuan had both worked at nightclubs and had been dead for months by the time police had found their corpses. They were tortured and killed for trying to fight back. The remaining four women were convicted for working with Li Hao to kill Cai and Zhang Xuanxuan.

Three women, Duan, Jiang, and Zhang Moumou were charged with murder but were given lighter punishments (shown leniency) due to the situation Li Hao forced them into. According to Xinhua, two (Jiang and Zhang) were sentenced to probation, while the third (Duan Moumou) was jailed for three years. The six KTV women had worked at nightclubs, hair salons, karaoke bars, and a massage shop.

A lawyer from Changsha, Zhang Yan, tried to represent the women in court. Zhang said that Li Hao's death penalty was predictable, but that she tried to lobby for lighter sentences for the three women who were forced by Li Hao to kill the two other women.

Police say that the victims may be suffering from Stockholm syndrome.

Public response 
In 2011, Guo Congbin said that the delay between when Li Hao abducted the women and when he was finally caught and arrested was too long and indicated that the local police were ineffective. Guo said that four police officers were suspended and that entertainment areas such as nightclubs and bars were to be more thoroughly inspected. Moreover, the internet was to be subject to intense cleansing of pornography sites.

The Chinese nation was shocked and horrified by the details of the crime. Reporter Ji Xuguang, from the Southern Metropolis Daily, was one of the journalists who exposed Li Hao's crimes. Ji Xuguang was detained for leaking 'state secrets'. Ji originally traveled to Luoyang to report on the Li Xiang case, but then brought Li Hao's story to national attention. For some time, local newspapers were forbidden from reporting on the case as officials feared it would tarnish the city's image and bid to win the 'Civilized City' award. At the time local authorities were shocked, and very few high level officials knew of the case.

Authorities denied such claims of coverup. Moreover, later Li Hao's story was widely covered and spread by national media with Li Hao's crimes terrifying and being severely condemned by the public.

Overseas news media has also condemned Li Hao for carrying out 'twisted fantasies', with other sources calling him a 'monster'. Fox News reported that Li Hao subjected his captives to 'horrifying' sexual and emotional abuse.

A resident Kou Yongxue who lives in the building above the dungeon said that Li Hao's crimes were unimaginable and that they were still 'shuddering' at the sex slave case.

Li Hao's sex slave case is described in detail in a book written by Liu Baiju (刘白驹) titled "Sexual Offenders: Psychopathology and Control" (性犯罪：精神病理与控制).

Personal life 
Li Hao was married and had an eight-month old son at the time of his arrest. His wife was 24 at the time.

He worked for the technology bureau in Henan. He also used to work as a firefighter for the Luoyang City Fire Bureau. Li Hao and his son lived elsewhere away from the dungeon in Luoyang.

According to Li Hao, his wife had no knowledge of his dungeon and sex slaves. Li lied to his wife saying he found a night time job. He spent two weeks a month with the women captives in his dungeon.

See also 
 Fritzl case
 Natascha Kampusch
 Ariel Castro kidnappings

References 

1977 births
2014 deaths
21st-century Chinese criminals
Chinese male criminals
Chinese people convicted of murder
Chinese people convicted of rape
People convicted of murder by China
People executed by China
Executed Chinese people